Arnalda de Caboet (died 1202), was a Andorran feudal ruler.

She was suo jure ruling Lady of Caboet (Cabó), Andorra and Sant Joan in Andorra in 1180-1199. 

She was born to Arnau de Caboet. 

She married Arnaud I of Castelbon and became the mother of Ermessenda de Castellbò.

References

1202 deaths
12th-century women rulers
Andorran nobility